P. Moorthy, Minister of Commercial Taxes, Registration and Stamp Law, is an Indian politician who is a current member of the Tamil Nadu Legislative Assembly. He represents Madurai East constituency as a member of Dravida Munnetra Kazhagam. Previously, he represented Sholavandan constituency.

Electoral performance

References

Dravida Munnetra Kazhagam politicians
Year of birth missing (living people)
Living people
Tamil Nadu MLAs 2021–2026
Tamil Nadu MLAs 2016–2021
Tamil Nadu MLAs 2006–2011